Disholcaspis is a genus of gall wasps in the family Cynipidae. There are more than 40 species described in the genus Disholcaspis. Some Disholcaspis species induce galls that produce honeydew, a sweet liquid that attracts yellow jackets, ants, and bees. These insects then protect the galls from parasitic wasps.

Species
These 42 species belong to the genus Disholcaspis:

 Disholcaspis acetabula (Weld, 1921)
 Disholcaspis bassetti (Gillette, 1888)
 Disholcaspis bettyannae Medianero & Nieves-Aldrey, 2011
 Disholcaspis bisethiae Medianero & Nieves-Aldrey, 2011
 Disholcaspis brevinota Weld, 1921
 Disholcaspis canescens Weld, 1957 - Round honeydew gall wasp
 Disholcaspis cinerosa (Bassett, 1881) - Mealy oak gall wasp
 Disholcaspis colorado Gillette, 1893
 Disholcaspis costaricensis Melika & Pujade-Villar, 2021
 Disholcaspis crystalae Pujade-Villar, 2018
 Disholcaspis edura Weld, 1957
 Disholcaspis eldoradensis (Beutenmuller, 1909) - Honeydew gall wasp
 Disholcaspis erugomamma Cooke-McEwen & Gates, 2020
 Disholcaspis fungiformis Kinsey, 1920
 Disholcaspis globosa Weld, 1921
 Disholcaspis insulana Kinsey, 1938
 Disholcaspis lacuna Weld, 1921
 Disholcaspis laetae Kinsey, 1937
 Disholcaspis largior Kinsey, 1938
 Disholcaspis mamillana Weld, 1957
 Disholcaspis mellifica Pujade-Villar, 2017
 Disholcaspis mexicana Weld, 1957
 Disholcaspis pallens Kinsey, 1938
 Disholcaspis pattersoni Kinsey, 1922
 Disholcaspis pedunculoides Weld, 1926
 Disholcaspis perniciosa (Bassett, 1890)
 Disholcaspis potosina Kinsey, 1937
 Disholcaspis prehensa Weld, 1957 - Clasping twig gall wasp
 Disholcaspis pruniformis Kinsey, 1920
 Disholcaspis pulla Kinsey, 1937
 Disholcaspis purlans Kinsey, 1937
 Disholcaspis purpurea Kinsey, 1937
 Disholcaspis quercusglobulus (Fitch, 1859) - Round bullet gall wasp
 Disholcaspis quercusmamma (Walsh, 1869) - Oak rough bulletgall wasp
 Disholcaspis quercusomnivora Weld, 1959
 Disholcaspis quercusvirens (Ashmead, 1881)
 Disholcaspis regina Kinsey, 1937
 Disholcaspis rubens (Gillette, 1893)
 Disholcaspis simulata Kinsey, 1922 - Dried peach gall wasp
 Disholcaspis spissa Weld, 1957
 Disholcaspis spongiosa Weld, 1926
 Disholcaspis terrestris Weld

References

Further reading

 
 
 

Cynipidae
Articles created by Qbugbot

Taxa described in 1910
Hymenoptera genera
Taxa named by Karl Wilhelm von Dalla Torre
Taxa named by Jean-Jacques Kieffer
Gall-inducing insects